The Plumerville School Building is a historic school building on Arnold Street in Plumerville, Arkansas.  It is a single-story wood-frame structure, finished with local fieldstone and covered by a gable roof. Gabled entry pavilions project from the front, supported by stone posts.  It is believed that this structure was built for an African-American church congregation about 1925, with a wooden exterior, and was finished in stone during the 1930s by a Works Progress Administration crew.

The building was listed on the National Register of Historic Places in 1992.

See also
National Register of Historic Places listings in Conway County, Arkansas

References

School buildings on the National Register of Historic Places in Arkansas
Buildings and structures in Conway County, Arkansas